John McCusker (born 15 May 1973) is a Scottish folk musician, record producer, and composer. An accomplished fiddle player, he had a long association as a member of the Battlefield Band beginning in the 1990s and was later a band member and producer for folk singer Kate Rusby. He has served as producer and arranger for artists in a range of genres and also has several solo albums to his credit.

Career
McCusker was born in Bellshill, Scotland in May 15, 1973. He had an Irish mother who encouraged him to learn to play the fiddle beginning at age seven. He became a regular in local youth orchestras and ceilidh bands and formed the band Parcel O'Rogues (named from Robert Burns' Sic a Parcel o' Rogues in a Nation) with some schoolmates when he was 14. A couple of years later he gave up a place at the Royal Scottish Academy in Glasgow to tour with the Battlefield Band, who he spent eleven years with. His first solo album was released by Temple in 1995.

McCusker has also performed on albums by Ocean Colour Scene, Paul Weller, Teenage Fanclub, Danny Thompson, Eddi Reader, Tim O'Brien and Linda Thompson. He also has shared stages with Bonnie Raitt, Patti Smith, Steve Earle, Rosanne Cash, Paolo Nutini and Jools Holland.

McCusker was also a producer for folk singer Kate Rusby, who he married in August 2001, but divorced in 2006.

After a 6-month world tour with Mark Knopfler, McCusker released a new record along with Orcadian singer Kris Drever and Idlewild front man, Roddy Woomble. The album Before the Ruin was released in September 2008, and features members of Teenage Fanclub, Radiohead, Michael McGoldrick and Heidi Talbot.

In 2007, McCusker was jointly commissioned by the Celtic Connections festival and Cambridge Folk Festival to compose Under One Sky, uniting Scottish and English musicians of different genres, from Gaelic singer Julie Fowlis to ex-Blur guitarist Graham Coxon. He toured to support Under One Sky in the UK in November and December 2008.

After bassist Mike McNamara introduced John and Simon Fowler of Ocean Colour Scene to each other, Fowler subsequently presented him with the BBC Radio 2 folk musician of the year award in 2003. McCusker has appeared live on numerous of times with the Birmingham band, and in 2012 McCusker appeared on Fowler's 'Merrymouth' album, he also joined the band on their UK tour

In 2014, McCusker once again appeared on Fowlers solo project, now called Merrymouth, brand new album 'Wenlock Hill'. The album also features a guest appearance from Chas Hodges from Chas and Dave

Discography

Solo albums
 John McCusker (1995)
 Yella Hoose (2001)
 Goodnight Ginger (2004)
 Before the Ruin (2008) (with Roddy Woomble and Kris Drever)
 Under One Sky (2009) (with Under One Sky tour artists)
 Hello, Goodbye (2016)

As producer
Kate Rusby and Kathryn Roberts – Kate Rusby & Kathryn Roberts (1995)
Kate Rusby – Hourglass (1997)
Kate Rusby – Sleepless (1999)
Cathie Ryan – Somewhere Along the Road (2001)
Kate Rusby – Little Lights (2001)
Kate Rusby – 10 (2002)
Blazin' Fiddles – The Old Style (2002)
Kate Rusby – Underneath the Stars (2003)
Cathie Ryan – The Farthest Wave (2005)
Kate Rusby –  The Girl Who Couldn't Fly (2005)
Roddy Woomble – My Secret is My Silence (2006)
Kris Drever –  Black Water (2006)
Eddi Reader –  Peacetime (2007)
Drever, McCusker, Woomble – Before the Ruin (2008)
Under One Sky – Under One Sky (2009)
Kris Drever – Mark the Hard Earth (2010)

Other appearances
Ballad of the Broken Seas – Mark Lanegan & Isobel Campbell (2006)
Ballads of the Book – Idlewild's "The Weight of Years" (2007)
This Is What Makes Us – Foxface (2007)
22 Dreams – Paul Weller (2008)
Kill to Get Crimson – Mark Knopfler (2008)
In Love and Light – Heidi Talbot (2008)
Hold Your Horses – Ella Edmondson (2009)
Love is the Way – Eddi Reader (2009)
Post Electric Blues – Idlewild (2009)
Get Lucky – Mark Knopfler (2009)
Bretonne - Nolwenn Leroy (2010)
Transatlantic Sessions 5 (2010) – (directed by Jerry Douglas and Aly Bain)
Merrymouth – Simon Fowler (2012)
Live (with Michael McGoldrick & John Doyle, 2009 tour) – Vertical Records (2012)
Privateering – Mark Knopfler (2012)
Suitcase – Jennifer Byrne (2013)
Wenlock Hill – Merrymouth (2014)
Tracker – Mark Knopfler (2015)
The Art of Forgetting – Kyle Carey (2018)
The Wishing Tree (with Michael McGoldrick & John Doyle) - Under One Sky Records (2018)
Down the Road Wherever - Mark Knopfler (2018)
Yes, I Have Ghosts - David Gilmour (2020)

Awards and nominations

Awards won
 BBC Radio 2 Folk Awards 2016 - Good Tradition Award
 Spirit of Scotland Award for Music 2009
 BBC Radio 2 Folk Music Awards 2003 – Musician of the Year
 Spirit of Scotland Award for Music 2000

Nominations
 BBC Radio 2 Folk Music Awards – Musician of the Year 2010

 Best Instrumentalist Ireland's Music Awards 2009
 BBC Radio 2 Folk Music Awards – Musician of the Year 2009
 Composer of the Year Scots Trad Music Awards 2007
 BBC Radio 2 Folk Music Awards – Musician of the Year 2008
 BBC Radio 2 Folk Music Awards – Musician of the Year 2007

References

External links
 official website

Scottish fiddlers
British male violinists
1974 births
Citternists
Living people
Battlefield Band members
21st-century violinists
21st-century British male musicians